Blanche of Castile (August 1319 – 1375) was by birth a member of the Castilian House of Burgundy. She was the only child of Infante Peter of Castile (son of King Sancho IV of Castile) and Infanta Maria of Aragon (daughter of King James II of Aragon).

Life
Blanche was born in the city of Alcocer, Guadalajara in August 1319, two months after the death of her father in the Disaster of the Vega de Granada (25 June 1319). Her parents had married in December 1311 in the city of Calatayud. Her father, Infante Peter, was Lord of Los Cameros, Almazán, Berlanga de Duero, Monteagudo and Cifuentes and Mayordomo mayor of his brother, King Ferdinand IV of Castile; after the latter's death (which occurred in 1312) he was appointed guardian of his nephew Alfonso XI of Castile and joint Regent of the Kingdom together with the infant King's grandmother (and Peter's mother), Maria de Molina and Infante John of Castile (son of King Alfonso X of Castile), who was also killed in la Vega de Granada with Peter.

After the death of Infante Peter of Castile, Garci Lasso de la Vega (who later became a confidant of King Alfonso XI), wrote to King James II of Aragon that his son-in-law promised him that his unborn child would be raised by him as his ayo. King James II responded to Garci Lasso in a letter dated 7 August 1319 that he approved the late Infante's wish and also recommended him to continue to be a loyal servant for his daughter, the Infanta Maria.

In the spring of 1320, Blanche and her mother left the Kingdom of Castile for the Kingdom of Aragon, with the consent of Blanche's uncle Infante Philip of Castile and grandmother Maria de Molina, despite the fact that Blanche was the sole heiress of Infante Peter's possessions.

However, Juan Manuel, Prince of Villena (grandson of King Ferdinand III of Castile and contender for the Regency of the Kingdom) and his wife Constance of Aragon (daughter of King James II and in consequence Blanche's maternal aunt), insisted to King James II that Blanche and her mother remain in Castile under their protection. Several historians believed that the real purpose of Juan Manuel to kept his sister-in-law and niece under his control was to secure the support of his father-in-law King James II in his fight for the regency, and in the same time, managed Blanche's inheritance.

In 1322, her mother and Garci Lasso de la Vega, who was the administrator of her estates in Castilian territory, agreed that Blanche should marry her cousin King Alfonso XI when she came of age; however, the plans fell through and the marriage didn't take place.

In 1325 King James II planned to marry his granddaughter to John of Castile, Lord of Biscay, nicknamed the One-Eyed, an enemy of Philip of Castile, Garci Lasso de la Vega and Alvar Núñez Osorio, who were the new confidants to Alfonso XI of Castile. In 1325 Alfonso XI attained his majority and annulled the betrothal of Blanche and John, fearing that the Lord of Biscay would take possession of Blanche's lands bordering the Kingdoms of Castile and Aragon, and from there he rebelled against him. On 31 October 1326, John of Castile was murdered in the town of Toro by orders of Alfonso XI.

In October 1327, Álvar Núñez Osorio negotiated with King Afonso IV of Portugal the marriage contracts of Blanche and Infante Peter of Portugal, the king's son and heir,  and that of Infante Peter's sister, Maria and the future Alfonso XI of Castile.  Since both Peter and Blanche were minors, the marriage had to wait. Blanche was taken to be raised in Portugal until she was of age for marriage.  According to the Chronicle of Pedro I of Portugal by Fernão Lopes, during her stay, she began to show signs of illness and "defects of judgement" which made her unsuitable for marriage and for procreation. She was examined by physicians, including those sent by Alfonso XI, who confirmed her weak mental health and incapacity, and, because of "Infante Pedro's refusal and the evident mental disorder of doña Blanca" the proposed marriage never took place.  

During this time, Juan Manuel secretly negotiated with King Alfonso IV the marriage of his daughter Constance Manuel with Infante Pedro. Blanche returned to Aragon accompanied by Martim Fernandes de Portocarreiro and an entourage of Portuguese nobles with her entire dowry and money.

In 1329, during the meetings between Kings Alfonso IV of Aragon and Alfonso XI of Castile in the cities of Ágreda and Tarazona, the Castilian King, using his presence in the Aragonese Kingdom, disposed that his cousin Blanche, who was living with her mother in Aragon, returned with him to Castile, according to the Gran Crónica de Alfonso XI.

Alfonso XI gradually confiscated the lordships that had belonged to Blanche, and as of 1336, began to distribute these among his illegitimate children with Eleanor de Guzmán.

Once in the Kingdom of Castile, Blanche was named Lady of Santa María la Real de Las Huelgas, the last one to hold the civil dominion over the monastery.

Blanche was buried in Las Huelgas, alongside her parents. During excavations in the monastery in the first half of the 20th century, it was discovered that her remains are mummified. The mummy was big and corpulent, and her black-and-white habit was torn.

Her body now rests on a simple stone tomb placed in the nave of the Epistle, opposite the tomb containing the remains of her mother, infanta Maria of Aragon.

Ancestry

Notes

References

 Translations from Spanish Wikipedia

Bibliography 

 
 
 
 
 
 
 
 
 

 
 

1315 births
1375 deaths
Castilian House of Burgundy
14th-century Castilians
14th-century Spanish women